Below is the list of the 118th Maine Senate, which was sworn into office in December 1996 and left office in December 1998.

Mark Lawrence (D) of South Berwick served as President of the Maine Senate.

1 Judy Paradis (D) of St. Agatha, Aroostook County
2 Leo Kieffer (R) of Caribou, Aroostook County
3 Mike Michaud (D) of Millinocket, Penobscot County
4 Vinton Cassidy (R) of Calais, Washington County
5 Jill Goldthwait (U) of Bar Harbor, Hancock County 
6 Richard Ruhlin Sr. (D) of Brewer, Penobscot County
7 Mary Cathcart (D) of Orono, Penobscot County
8 Stephen Hall (R) of Guilford, Piscataquis County
9 Robert Murray (D) of Bangor, Penobscot County
10 Betty Lou Mitchell (R) of Etna, Penobscot County
11 Susan Longley (D) of Liberty, Waldo County
12 Chellie Pingree (D) of North Haven, Knox County
13 Peter Mills (R) of Cornville, Somerset County
14 Richard Carey (D) of Belgrade, Kennebec County
15 Beverly Daggett (D) of Augusta, Kennebec County
16 Marjoie Kilkelly (D) of Wiscasset, Lincoln County
17 John Benoit (R) of Sandy River Plantation, Franklin County
18 Sharon Treat (D) of Hallowell, Kennebec County
19 Mary Small (R) of Bath, Sagadahoc County
20 John Nutting (D) of Leeds, Androscoggin County
21 John Jenkins (D) of Auburn, Androscoggin County
22 John Cleveland (D) of Auburn, Androscoggin County
23 Phil Harriman (R) of Yarmouth, Cumberland County
24 Norman Ferguson (R) of Hanover, Oxford County
25 Richard A. Bennett (R) of Oxford, Oxford
26 Jeffrey Butland (R) of Cumberland, Cumberland County
27 Joel Abromson (R) of Portland, Cumberland County
28 Anne Rand (D) of Portland, Cumberland County
29 William O'Gara (D) of Westbrook, Cumberland County
30 Jane Amero (R) of Cape Elizabeth, Cumberland County
31 Peggy Pendleton (D) of Scarborough, Cumberland County
32 Lloyd LaFontain (D) of Biddeford, York County
33 Bruce MacKinnon (R) of Springvale, York County
34 James Libby (R) of Buxton, York County
35 Mark Lawrence (D) of South Berwick, York County Senate President

Maine legislative sessions
1996 in Maine
1997 in Maine
1998 in Maine
1990s in Maine